Abdullah ad-Daghistani (December 14, 1891 – September 30, 1973), commonly known as Shaykh Abdullah, was a North Caucasian Sufi shaykh of the Naqshbandi-Sufi order.

Early life
He was born in the North Caucasian region of Dagestan, then colony of the Russian Empire, in 1891.  Both his father and elder brother were medical doctors, the latter being a surgeon in the Imperial Russian Army. Shaykh Abdullah was raised and trained by his maternal uncle, Shaykh Sharafuddin Daghistani (1875–1936).

Move to Ottoman Turkey
In the late 1890s Shaykh Abdullah's family emigrated to the Ottoman Empire, following his uncle, Shaykh Sharafuddin who had emigrated in the 1870s. They settled in the northwestern Anatolian city of Bursa and after a year moved to the village of Reşadiye, now known as Güneyköy, in Yalova Province, Turkey. The new village was established on land granted by the sultan and was populated by Daghistani refugees affected by the War of ‘93 and the uprising against the Russian Empire. Shortly thereafter, Shaykh Abdullah’s father died, and at the age of 15 he married a Daghistani named Halima.

Training in Sufism

In 1910, after merely six months of marriage, Shaykh Sharafuddin ordered Abdullah into sacred seclusion (khalwat) for five years. This practice included severe austerities that were intended to raise his spiritual rank. When Abdullah returned to secular life the Ottoman Empire was embroiled in the First World War. Along with many young men of his village, Abdullah entered military service and took part in the Battle of Gallipoli. During a firefight he was severely wounded by enemy fire.

In 1921, Abdullah was instructed by Shaykh Sharafuddin to enter another five years seclusion. He completed this and was then granted a license, or ijazah, to be a master, or shaykh, in the Naqshbandi order.

Interlude in Egypt
Because of anti-Sufi regulations in the new Turkish Republic, Shaykh Abdullah began to contemplate leaving the country. After the death of Shaykh Sharafuddin in 1936, a delegation came to Rashadiya (Reşadiye) from King Farouk to pay their condolences, as he had many followers in Egypt. One of Shaykh Abdullah's daughters married a member of the delegation. Shaykh Abdullah and the family then moved to Egypt, though they would remain there for only half a year as the marriage soon ended in divorce.

Life in Syria
Following his daughter's divorce, Shaykh Abdullah and his family then moved to Syria where he would remain for the rest of his life.  He resided for a time in Aleppo, moved to Homs and then finally to Damascus near the tomb of saint Sa’d ad-Din Jibawi. There, he established the first tekke for his branch of the Naqshbandi order.

In 1943, he moved to a house on Jabal Qasioun mountain. The house was bought by his first Syrian murid and later one of his deputies in the Sufi order, Shaykh Husayn Ifrini. This house is now the site of his burial shrine and its adjoining mosque.

Death
Shaykh Abdullah died on September 30, 1973 in Damascus. His grave and burial shrine is in Damascus, Syria, at the site of his former home and mosque on Jabal Qasioun mountain.

Notable followers
Among his notable followers were the Sufi shaykhs Nazim al-Haqqani,Shaykh Hisham al Kabbani,Adil Merlet, Husayn Ifrini and Adnan Kabbani. George Gurdjieff visited him and received the secrets of the Enneagram and Nine Points. One of his successors, Shaykh Nazim, went on to spread this branch of the Naqshbandi Sufi order to many countries in the world, and was considered among the world's most influential Muslims.

See also
John G. Bennett
George Gurdjieff

References

External links 
 Media Library and Live Broadcast of the Haqqani Golden Chain
  Sheikh Nazim's Official Naqshbandi Journal - Exclusive Talks & Webcast as instructed by Sheikh Nazim Al-Haqqani himself
Film - The Maqam (Burial Residence) and Biography of Grand Sheikh Abdullah al-Faiz ad-Daghastani by Sheikh Adnan Kabbani, produced by Sufi Films

1891 births
1973 deaths
Russian Muslims
Russian Sufis
Naqshbandi order